Tin Sau may refer to:

Places 

 Tin Sau Bazaar, Tin Shui Wai, Hong Kong
 Tin Sau stop, an MTR Light Rail stop in Tin Shui Wai, Hong Kong

People 

 Lam Tin Sau (born 1963), Hong Kong athlete